Naren Hua (born 17 November 1962) is a Chinese film and television actress of Mongolian ethnicity.

Name 

Her name is derived from the Mongolian word for sunflower (   – "sun", ; "flower"). It is sometimes romanised as Na Renhua or Na Ren-Hua.

Early life
Naren Hua was born on November 17, 1962 in Xilingol League, Inner Mongolia, China.
She once lived in London and Hong Kong.

Career 
Naren Hua began her film career in 1976 in Zhan Di Huang Hua.

In 1986 she played Xiao Xiao in Xie Fei's A Girl from Hunan, which was screened in the Un Certain Regard section at the 1987 Cannes Film Festival, and was one of the first mainland Chinese films to be commercially screened in the United States. The film is based on a 1929 short-story, Xiao Xiao (or Hsiao Hsiao), by author Shen Congwen. A Girl from Hunan tells the story of a willful young girl (initially played by Lin Qing and played as an adult by Naren Hua) who, at the start of the film, is about to enter into an arranged marriage with a two-year-old child, Chun Guan. Xiao Xiao, the girl in question, is only twelve. She lets herself be seduced by a farmhand and soon finds herself pregnant. Knowing that the traditional village still executes women for adultery, Xiao Xiao is desperate to abort the baby but fails to accomplish her goal.

In 1995 she was again directed by Xie Fei in A Mongolian Tale, an adaptation of Zhang Chengzhi's novel Black Steed, which was positively received, being noted both for its performances and settings. The movie had its premiere at the Montreal World Film Festival.

In 2002 she had the leading role in Heavenly Grassland. The film tells about  a young Han Chinese boy, Tiger, who is adopted by a family living in the steppes of Inner Mongolia. The boy's father asks a man named Shergan to look after his child while in prison. Shergan keeps his word and brings the boy to Mongolia, where he shares his yurt with his ex-wife Baruma, played by Naren Hua. The boy is at first shocked and repelled by the way of life of the people there, but in time learns to love his new homeland. The movie won Best Photography Award at the Golden Rooster Awards. Her performance was particularly praised and won Nare Hua several accolades, including the Shanghai Film Critics Awards for Best Actress.

In 2010 she had the leading role in Mother, also known as My Mongolian Mother (Chinese: E ji). The film, based on a true story, tells about two Chinese children transplanted in Mongolia, where they are adopted by Qiqigema Erji (Naren Hua) against the wishes of her husband, and raised as nomads. Twenty years later one of the children knows about his biological parents and leaves for Shanghai. The other child also finally meets his biological parents, and is then faced with a choice. Naren Hua won the Best Actress Award at the 28th Golden Rooster Awards for her performance in this movie.

In 2017 she had a supporting role in Li Ruijun's Walking Past the Future. In 2019 she played Juimei in A Dog Barking at the Moon. The movie, which won the award for Best First Feature Film at the Inside Out Film and Video Festival and the Teddy Award at the 69th Berlin International Film Festival for its LGBT topics, tells about a pregnant daughter who is caught between her homosexual father and "unmitigated termagant" mother (Naren Hua), who reverses on her daughter all her anger, whose chief cause is her father's homosexuality. Her performance in this movie was said to carry the "film’s sometimes outrageous narrative throughout."

Filmography

Awards and nominations

References

External links
 
 
 

1962 births
Living people
Chinese film actresses
Chinese people of Mongolian descent
People from Xilingol League
Actresses from Inner Mongolia